Marchande de modes was a French Guild organisation for women fashion merchants or milliners, normally meaning ornaments for headdresses, hats and dresses, within the city of Paris, active from August 1776 until 1791. It played a dominating role within the commercial life and fashion industry of France during the last decades prior to the French Revolution. Amongst its members where Rose Bertin, Mademoiselle Alexandre and Madame Eloffe.

See also
 Maîtresses marchandes lingères
 Maîtresses couturières

References
 James-Sarazin, Ariane et Lapasin, Régis, Gazette des atours de Marie-Antoinette, Paris, Réunion des Musées Nationaux - Archives nationales, 2006

Guilds in France
History of women in France
Historical legal occupations
18th century in Paris
1791 disestablishments in France
History of fashion
1776 establishments in France
Fashion occupations
18th-century fashion
French businesspeople in fashion
18th-century French businesspeople
1776 in France
18th century in women's history